The Women's pentathlon event  at the 1999 IAAF World Indoor Championships was held on March 5.

Medalists

Results

60 metres hurdles

High jump

Shot put

Long jump

800 metres

Final results

References
Results

Pentathlon
Combined events at the World Athletics Indoor Championships
1999 in women's athletics